No Rules may refer to:

No Rules (film), a 2005 film
No Rules (GMS album)
No Rules (Rebecca Lynn Howard album)